Serhiy Ihorovych Harashchenkov (born 16 May 1990) is a former Ukrainian professional football player.

Career
He made his Russian Premier League debut for FC Amkar Perm on 22 October 2011 in a game against FC Terek Grozny.

In February 2013 he signed 4-years deal with FC Karpaty Lviv.

In April 2019 the player (and his last club PFC Sumy) was banned from professional football by the Ukrainian Football Federation due to match fixing by players of PFC Sumy.

External links
 
 Profile at FFU Official Site (Ukr)
 
 Serhiy Harashchenkov at FootballFacts.ru

References

1990 births
Living people
People from Novohrodivka
Ukrainian footballers
Association football defenders
Ukraine under-21 international footballers
Ukrainian Premier League players
Ukrainian expatriate footballers
Expatriate footballers in Russia
Expatriate footballers in Belarus
Russian Premier League players
Ukrainian First League players
FC Shakhtar Donetsk players
FC Shakhtar-3 Donetsk players
FC Komunalnyk Luhansk players
FC Amkar Perm players
FC Karpaty Lviv players
FC Mariupol players
FC Slutsk players
FC Hirnyk-Sport Horishni Plavni players
PFC Sumy players
Sportspeople involved in betting scandals
Sportspeople from Donetsk Oblast